The  is an account of the diplomatic contacts between the Ahom kingdom and the Tripura Kingdom between 1709 and 1715.  The Buranji was written in 1724 by the envoys of the Ahom kingdom, Ratna Kandali Sarma Kataki and Arjun Das Bairagi Kataki.  It describes three diplomatic missions that was sent to the Twipra kingdom, two return missions accompanied by Tripuri envoys, incidental descriptions of palaces, ceremonies and customs; and it also provides an eye witness account of the Twipra king Ratna Manikya II (1684–1712) deposed by his step-brother Ghanashyam Barthakur, later Mahendra Manikya (1712–1714).

This manuscript falls under the class of documents called Buranjis, a tradition of chronicle writing of the Ahom kingdom, of which there are two types—official and family. The Tripura Buranji, along with Padshah Buranji, Kachari Buranji and Jaintia Buranji are official reports of neighboring kingdoms that the Ahom court sanctioned and maintained for record. Surya Kumar Bhuyan, who had edited this as well as many other Buranjis, considered it to enjoy an exalted position among similar class of writings. 

Writers such as Chaudhuri and Sarkar consider the little-known document to be a significant source of extant events in Tripura. Besides, as N K Bhattacharya avers, it is a remarkable example of pre-colonial travel writing among such other writings as Kalidasa's Meghadootam etc. that describes "the landscape, habits, dress, manners and beliefs of the people, deities and temples and the intrigues for the throne within the court of Tripura."

Manuscript 
The manuscript is written in Assamese and bears the title , comprising about 146 folios (4"x17") of  made from the bark of the Aloe tree. Each folio had five lines of text on both sides and the 108th folio was missing. A table of contents existed at the end. The manuscript was purchased by the British Museum from J. Rodd on 8 January 1842. According to Bhuyan who has examined the manuscript, "the writings are legible, the words are separated and the divisions clearly marked"; and the handwriting displays cautious penmanship.

Background 
The diplomatic missions that constitute the core of the accounts in this document were triggered by the Ahom king Rudra Singha's desire to create a confederacy with the Twipra (and Morang, Bana-Vishnupur, Nadiya, Cooch Behar, Burdwan, and Barahanagar) kingdom to remove the Mughals from Bengal.  There were three missions between the years 1709 and 1715.

Contents
It describes "the landscape, habits, dress, manners and beliefs of the people, deities and temples and the intrigues for the throne within the court of Tripura." The strict protocols governing the diplomatic missions of the Ahom and Twipra kingdoms are described. A spring festival, as celebrated by the Twipra king and his subjects is noted of.

Notes

References 

 
 
 
 
 
 

Ahom kingdom
Indian manuscripts
History of Tripura